Mitch Holmes (born June 28, 1962) was a Republican member of the Kansas House of Representatives, representing the 114th district, where he served from 2005 to 2013.  He was then elected to represent the 33rd district in the Kansas Senate in 2012. He decided not to run for reelection on June 1, 2016. During his time in the legislature, he was given evaluations of 69%, 76%, 67%, 73% and the most recent evaluation of 82% from the American Conservative Union.

Prior to his election to the House, Holmes worked as a computer programmer and analyst.  He received his Certificate in Computer Programming from DePaul University, a BS in Human Resource Management from Friends University, and an AA in Music Education from Hutchinson Community College.

Committee membership
 Appropriations
 Federal and State Affairs
 Local Government (Vice-chair)
 Joint Committee on Energy and Environmental Policy
 Joint Committee on Special Claims Against the State (Vice-chair)
 Joint Committee on State Building Construction

Major donors
The top 5 donors to Holmes' 2008 campaign:
1. Koch Industries 	$600 	
2. Kansas Assoc of Realtors 	$500
3. Sunflower Electric Power Corp 	$400 	
4. Kansas Land Title Assoc PAC 	$250
5. HSBC North America 	$250

References

External links
 Official Website
 Kansas Legislature - Mitch Holmes
 Project Vote Smart profile
 Kansas Votes profile
 State Surge - Legislative and voting track record
 Campaign contributions: 2004, 2006, 2008

Republican Party members of the Kansas House of Representatives
Living people
DePaul University alumni
Friends University alumni
1962 births
21st-century American politicians
Republican Party Kansas state senators
Hutchinson Community College alumni